Caria ino, the red-bordered metalmark, is a species of metalmark in the butterfly family Riodinidae. It is found in North America.

Subspecies
These two subspecies belong to the species Caria ino:
 Caria ino ino
 Caria ino melicerta Schaus, 1890

References

Further reading

External links

 

Riodinini
Articles created by Qbugbot